Guardia (Italian and Spanish, 'guard') may refer to:

People

Guardia (surname), including a list of people with the name
Rafael Ángel Calderón Guardia (1900–1970), Costa Rican politician
Francisco Calderón Guardia (1906–1977), Costa Rican politician

Places

Argentina
Guardia Mitre, a municipality in Rio Negro Province

Italy
Guardia Lombardi, a municipality in the Province of Avellino
Guardia Perticara, a municipality in the Province of Potenza
Guardia Piemontese, a municipality in the Province of Cosenza
Guardia Sanframondi, a municipality in the Province of Benevento
Villa Guardia, a municipality in the Province of Como

Police and military forces

Cuerpo Guardia de Infantería, an Argentinian police force
Guardia Civil, the Spanish gendarmerie
Costa Rican Civil Guard, a former gendarmerie
Civil Guard (Peru), a gendarmery
Guardia de Asalto, the urban police force of Spain during the Second Republic
Guardia di Finanza, an Italian police force
Guardia di Rocca, in San Marino
National Guard (El Salvador), a former gendarmerie
National Guard (Nicaragua), a Nicaraguan former militia
Venezuelan National Guard, of the National Armed Forces of Venezuela
National Republican Guard (Italy), a former gendarmerie
Republican Guard (Peru), a security force
Noble Guard, a Vatican former guard unit
Guardia Rural, a former Mexican force

Other uses
Gvardia Dushanbe, a Tajikistan football club
Guardia Republicana, a Peruvian football club

See also

La Guardia (disambiguation)
Garda (disambiguation)
Guarda (disambiguation)
Guard (disambiguation)
Guardian (disambiguation)
Giardia, a genus of parasitic protozoa